Robert W. Lafore (born March 11, 1938) is a computer programmer, systems analyst and entrepreneur.  He coined the term "interactive fiction", and was an early software developer in this field.

Career
Lafore worked as a systems analyst for the Lawrence Berkeley National Laboratory. In the early days of microcomputing, he wrote programs in BASIC for the TRS-80 and founded his own software company.

Lafore has written a number of text adventure games, for which he coined the term "interactive fiction", for the company Adventure International.

Lafore has authored a number of books on the subject of computer programming, including Soul of CP/M., and Assembly Language Primer for the IBM PC and XT.  Later books included C++ Interactive Course, Object-Oriented Programming in C++, Turbo C Programming for the IBM, and C Programming Using Turbo C++.  At one time he was an editor for the Waite Group publishers.

References

External links
http://www.informit.com/authors/bio.aspx?a=E8178A8C-D171-4B68-A507-127DE6FF7B9C
http://www.pearsoned.co.in/web/authors/3304/Robert_Lafore.aspx

1938 births
Living people
American computer programmers
Lawrence Berkeley National Laboratory people